Aaaba may refer to:
 Aaaba, a genus of sponges in the family Crellidae, synonym of Crellastrina
 Aaaba, a genus of beetles in the family Buprestidae, synonym of Aaaaba